Hypocrisy Is the Greatest Luxury is the debut album by alternative hip hop crew The Disposable Heroes of Hiphoprisy, released in 1992.  Hypocrisy Is the Greatest Luxury was met with critical acclaim.

"Television, the Drug of the Nation" was released as a single. It was recorded previously by Michael Franti's first band, the Beatnigs.

Critical reception 

In a contemporary review for The Village Voice, music critic Robert Christgau said that, although some of the ideas and metaphors are unconvincing, Michael Franti's "intellectual grasp thrusts him immediately into pop's front rank". He also praised DJ Rono Tse as "a one-man hip hop band" who, with the help of percussionist Mark Pistel, "creates more music than he samples, stretching Bomb Squad parameters to carry the tracks whenever Franti falters." Hypocrisy Is the Greatest Luxury finished number 19 in The Village Voices Pazz & Jop critics' poll. Christgau, the poll's creator, ranked it number 14 in his own list.

In a retrospective review, AllMusic's Ned Raggett said that the group "tackled every last big issue possible with one of 1992's most underrated efforts." He felt that, while its mix of "Bomb Squad and industrial music approaches" make it an appealing album, Franti's thematic breadth and "rich voice" are highlights.

Track listing

Charts

Samples
 "Satanic Reverses"
 Miles Davis - "Miles Runs The Voodoo Down"
 "Famous and Dandy"
 Herbie Hancock - "Watermelon Man"
 "Television, the Drug of the Nation"
 The Meters - "Look-Ka-Py-Py"
 "Language of Violence"
 This Mortal Coil - "Barramundi"
 "The Winter of the Long Hot Summer"
 This Mortal Coil - "Waves Become Wings"
 Wally Badarou - "Ayers Rock Bubble Eyes"
 "Everyday Life Has Become a Health Risk'
 Public Enemy - "Terminator X to the Edge of Panic"
 "California über alles"
 "California über alles" by Dead Kennedys
 "Water Pistol Man"
 Wally Badarou - "Leaving this Place"

Personnel
John Baker	 - 	Engineer
Kim Buie	 - 	Art Direction
The Disposable Heroes of Hiphoprisy	 - 	Editing, Art Direction, Mixing
Michael Franti	 - 	Arranger, Programming, Vocals, Backing Vocals
Vivian Hall	 	
Mark Heimback-Nielsen	 - 	Art Direction, Design
Charlie Hunter	 - 	Bass, Guitar, Vocals, Voices
Jeff Mann	 - 	Post Production Engineer
Mark Pistel	 - 	Arranger, Programming, Engineer, Mixing
Pete Scaturro	 - 	Engineer
Rono Tse	 - 	Percussion, Drums, Drums (Steel), Noise, Sheet Metal
Barbara Walker	 - 	Assistant Photographer
Howie Weinberg	 - 	Mastering
Simone White	 - 	Drums
Mat Callahan	 - 	Engineer
Jack Dangers	 - 	Mixing
Victor Hall	 - 	Art Direction, Photography
Jay Blakesberg	 - 	Photography
Sean Mathis	 - 	Assistant Photographer

References

The Disposable Heroes of Hiphoprisy albums
1992 debut albums
4th & B'way Records albums